The 2018 United States Senate election in Montana was held on November 6, 2018, to elect a member of the United States Senate to represent the State of Montana, concurrently with other elections to the United States Senate, elections to the United States House of Representatives and various state and local elections.

Although Montana went for Donald Trump by a margin of about 20 percent in 2016, incumbent Democratic Senator Jon Tester was reelected to a third term, defeating Republican State Auditor Matt Rosendale. Rosendale conceded on November 7, 2018. This was the first Senate election in which Tester received a majority of votes cast rather than a simple plurality.

Democratic primary

Candidates

Nominated
 Jon Tester, incumbent U.S. Senator

Endorsements

Results

Republican primary

Candidates

Nominated
 Matt Rosendale, Auditor of Montana and candidate for Congress in 2014

Eliminated in primary
 Troy Downing, veteran and businessman
 Russell Fagg, former Yellowstone County District Judge
 Albert Olszewski, state senator and candidate for lieutenant governor in 2012

Withdrew
 Ron Murray, businessman and candidate for the state house in 2010

Declined
 Tim Fox, Attorney General of Montana
 Robert J. O'Neill, former Navy SEAL (endorsed Troy Downing)
 Marc Racicot, former governor and former chairman of the Republican National Committee (endorsed Russell Fagg)
 Corey Stapleton, Secretary of State of Montana, candidate for governor in 2012 and candidate for Congress in 2014
 Ryan Zinke, former Secretary of the Interior and former U.S. Representative

Endorsements

Polling

Results

Libertarian primary

Candidates

Nominated
 Rick Breckenridge, 2016 candidate for the U.S. House of Representatives

In October 2018, Breckenridge told a reporter from the Associated Press that he opposed the use of dark money in politics. Breckenridge said that he realistically anticipated only receiving three or four percent of the vote in the general election, and that he endorsed Rosendale's efforts to stop the use of dark money in politics. The Associated Press interpreted Breckenridge's comments as a statement that Breckenridge was dropping out of the race and endorsing Rosendale. Breckenridge later stated that his use of the word "endorse" referred only to stopping the use of dark money in politics, and said he was still running for the Senate.

Green Party
Kelly won the Green Party nomination, but a Montana district court judge ruled that he had insufficient signatures to get on the ballot.

Candidates

Nominee (removed from ballot)
 Steve Kelly, artist and environmental activist

Eliminated in primary
 Timothy Adams

Results

General election

Debates 
Complete video of debate, September 29, 2018
Complete video of debate, October 14, 2018

Predictions

Endorsements

Fundraising

Polling

Results

By county 
From Secretary of State of Montana

Counties that flipped from Democratic to Republican
 Chouteau (largest municipality: Fort Benton)
 Rosebud (largest municipality: Colstrip)
 Yellowstone (largest municipality: Billings)

References

External links
Candidates at Vote Smart
Candidates at Ballotpedia
Campaign finance at FEC
Campaign finance at OpenSecrets

Official campaign websites
Matt Rosendale (R) for Senate
Jon Tester (D) for Senate

2018
Montana
United States Senate